Velasco Ibarra may refer to:
 José María Velasco Ibarra (1893–1979), Ecuadorian president
 El Empalme, Ecuador, known officially as Velasco Ibarra, a city in Guayas, Ecuador